Posing is the act of taking a pose, a stance, a body posture

Posing or variant may also refer to:

Role-playing, posing in a role
Pösing, Cham, Bavaria, Germany
Posing, an early form of the waacking style of street dance

See also

 
 Strike a pose (disambiguation)
 Poser (disambiguation)
 Pose (disambiguation)